Nancy Jean Augustyniak Goffi (born February 1, 1979) is an American former professional soccer player who featured primarily as a defender.

Early life 
Augustyniak Goffi went to Clemson University. While enrolled, she played for the Clemson Tigers women's soccer team.

Career 
Augustyniak Goffi played for the Atlanta Classics of the W-League from 1998 to 2000, before joining the Atlanta Beat at the team's inception. The Beat selected her in the 5th round of the 2000 WUSA Draft which was the 33rd overall pick. Her twin sister Julie Augustyniak also played for the Beat and they were involved in the first instance of two sets of twins that faced each other in a professional game when the Beat played against the Washington Freedom in 2002. Augustyniak Goffi would later describe playing in the WUSA as "the best three years of [her] life".

Augustyniak Goffi moved to 1. FFC Turbine Potsdam following the demise of the WUSA and made her Fußball-Bundesliga debut for the club on February 22, 2004, as a 70th-minute substitute against Hamburger SV.  She went on to appear for the club 13 times with 10 starts but no goals.  With the assistance of her twin sister, Julie Augustyniak, Turbine Potsdam went on to win both the 2003–2004 Fußball-Bundesliga championship and the 2003–04 Frauen DFB Pokal.

Career statistics

Club
These statistics are incomplete and currently represent a portion of Augustyniak's career.

References

External links 
 US Soccer player profile
 Women's Professional Soccer player profile
 Player profile at Women's United Soccer Association
 WUSA player profile
 Arizona State coaching profile

1979 births
Living people
Clemson Tigers women's soccer players
1. FFC Turbine Potsdam players
VfL Wolfsburg (women) players
Boston Breakers players
Atlanta Beat (WUSA) players
American women's soccer players
Women's association football defenders
American expatriate soccer players in Germany
Frauen-Bundesliga players
F.C. Indiana players
Women's Premier Soccer League players
American expatriate women's soccer players
Women's Professional Soccer players
Sportspeople from Norfolk, Virginia
Soccer players from Virginia
American expatriate sportspeople in Sweden
Expatriate women's footballers in Sweden
Chicago Cobras players
USL W-League (1995–2015) players
Women's United Soccer Association players